Stradivarius Records, Italian Casa Discografica Stradivarius (founded 1988) is a Milan based independent Italian record label specializing in early music and contemporary classical music. The record label was originally based from a shop in the Via Stradivari, but the shop is now located in the Via Sormani, Cologno Monzese. The label has collaborated with the Milan Conservatory in production of its recordings.

Modern composers
The label's Times Future series publishes many modern, predominantly living, Italian composers, among them Franco Donatoni, Salvatore Sciarrino, Bruno Maderna, Goffredo Petrassi, Andrea Molino, Ivan Fedele, Slovenian Marij Kogoj, Luis De Pablo, and others.

Artists
Artists who have recorded on Stradivarius include early music specialists: 
 
 René Clemencic
 Alan Curtis (harpsichordist)
 Kees Boeke
 and Monica Huggett
 fortepianist Emilia Fadini
 pianists Bruno Canino
 Jean-Pierre Dupuy (pianist)
 guitarists Gabriel Estarellas and Oscar Ghiglia
 conductors Luca Pfaff
 Josep Pons
 Arturo Tamayo
 Ensemble Contrechamps of Geneva
 Kammerorchester Münster
 Meinzer Kammerorchester
 Maggio Musicale Fiorentino
 Orchestra Sinfonica di Milano Giuseppe Verdi
 Orchestre Philharmonique de Radio France
 Filomena Moretti
 Eduardo Egüez
 Enrico Pompili
 Heinrich Schiff
 Ian Pace

References

Classical music record labels
Cologno Monzese